Anthony D. Romero (Born July 9, 1965) is the executive director of the American Civil Liberties Union. He assumed the position in 2001 as the first Latino and openly gay man to do so.

Early life and education
Romero was born in Bronx, New York city on July 9, 1965, to Puerto Rican parents Demetrio and Coralie Romero. Romero spent the initial years of his childhood growing up in a public housing project in the Bronx. He was the oldest of his siblings. His father worked as a houseman at a large Manhattan hotel and was repeatedly turned down for a more financially lucrative job as a banquet waiter, being told that it was because he did not speak English well enough. Demetrio Romero later decided to seek assistance from the attorney of the labor union he belonged to, hoping to file a grievance against his employer. He won the case, which allowed for him to seek out better paying work and later allowed for the family to improve their standard of living. The family subsequently moved to suburban New Jersey, where Anthony graduated high school.

Romero was the first member of his family to graduate from high school. He received his B.A. degree from Princeton University's Woodrow Wilson School of Public and International Affairs in 1987, having written a senior thesis titled "Colombian Migration and Political Participation in the United States". He later received a J.D. from Stanford University Law School in 1990. He is a member of the New York bar. He was a Dinkelspiel Scholar at Stanford University, a Cane Scholar at Princeton, and a National Hispanic Scholar at both institutions.

Early career
Romero started his career at the Rockefeller Foundation, notably leading a foundation review that helped determine future directions in civil rights advocacy. In 1992, Romero began working for the Ford Foundation, initially serving as a program officer in the Civil Rights and Social Justice Program. After less than four years in that position, he was promoted to the position of director, making him one of the youngest directors in the foundation's history. Prior to his departure, he served as the director of Human Rights and International Cooperation, transforming the program into the foundation's largest. As director, he managed and facilitated roughly $90 million in grants to civil rights, human rights, and peace projects. Notably, he also launched progressive initiatives in affirmative action, voting rights and redistricting, immigrants' rights, women's rights, reproductive freedom, and LGBT rights.

American Civil Liberties Union
Anthony Romero became executive director in September 2001, just before the September 11, 2001 attacks. He is the first openly gay man and the first Hispanic director of the civil liberties institution.

After the September 11th attacks, Romero launched a national campaign called "Keep America Safe and Free" to protect American civil liberties and basic freedoms during a time of crisis in the United States. The campaign successfully targeted the Patriot Act, achieving a number of court victories, and uncovered hundreds of thousands of documents detailing the illegal torture and abuse of detainees in U.S. custody in Iraq, Afghanistan, and Guantanamo. As a result of their successful court challenge to elements of the Patriot Act, the ACLU also forced the FBI to open files it had on antiwar groups, including the ACLU itself. Further, under Romero's leadership, the ACLU became the first organization to successfully file a legal challenge to the Bush administration's illegal National Security Agency (NSA) spying program. Shortly thereafter, Romero helped to establish the John Adams Project, in collaboration with the National Association of Criminal Defense Lawyers, to assist the under-resourced military defense lawyers in the Guantanamo military commissions. Referring to the August 17, 2006, federal court declaration that the Terrorist Surveillance Program was unconstitutional, Romero called the court's opinion "another nail in the coffin in the Bush administration's legal strategy in the War on Terror". Discussing the Bush administration, Romero said that the "eight years of President Bush will go down in history as one of the darkest moments in America's commitment to human rights".

Amidst 9/11 related concerns, ACLU membership, which had hovered around 300,000 for decades, increased to 573,000 following the terror attacks and subsequent legislation established during the Bush administration. Total donations to the ACLU doubled to more than twice the 2001 budget, increasing to about $28 million per year in the years following. Upon Romero's arrival, he increased the number of ACLU staff from 186 to 379 in 2001 alone. He also raised the salaries of staff members to be more in line with industry standards, in some cases increasing salaries by as much as 86%. In each of the ACLU's national affiliate offices, Romero hired and placed at least one staff attorney.

The ACLU's massive growth under Romero's leadership allowed for the organization to expand its activities with regard to racial justice, religious freedom, privacy rights, reproductive freedom, and LGBT rights. In recent years, this has enabled the organization to create a new Human Rights program as well as a division dedicated to privacy issues arising from new surveillance technology, including data mining and the collection of genetic data.

In 2007, Romero and the ACLU denounced the Pentagon for monitoring 186 antiwar protests and keeping files on pacifist groups, from Veterans for Peace to the Catholic Worker Movement.

 In 2008, Romero spoke at the March for Women's Lives in Washington, D.C., advocating for the legality of abortion.

In 2013, Romero, on behalf of the ACLU organization, praised Edward Snowden for his whistleblowing action against the NSA.

In 2016, Romero co-signed a letter to UN Secretary General Ban Ki-Moon calling for a more humane drug policy, along with people like Eve Ensler, Norman Lear, and Ernesto Zedillo.

Criticisms
During the course of his time with the ACLU, Romero has come under fire by other leaders within the organization, including board members and his predecessor, Ira Glasser. Their complaints have included assertions of his dishonesty and lack of integrity in the context of the workplace and with regard to the ACLU's work. His critics within the ACLU have launched websites such as savetheaclu.org and voicesfortheaclu.org, reporting that he "has betrayed fundamental ACLU values".

In 2002, Romero signed a consent decree the New York Attorney General at the time, Eliot Spitzer, to settle a privacy breach that had been discovered on the ACLU website. Although an outside company was responsible for the breach, Spitzer's office had demanded $10,000 from the ACLU for the error, which would later be reimbursed by the outside company directly responsible. However, as designated in the decree, Romero was required to distribute the decree itself to the national ACLU board within 30 days. Instead, he waited 6 months to do so, when he reportedly "offered vague and inconsistent explanations of the circumstances surrounding the negotiation, execution, and eventual distribution of the agreement".

In 2004, Romero received criticism for signing two agreements without the consent or approval of the larger ACLU leadership council. Most notable of the two was his signing of the Combined Federal Campaign, a government program that allows federal employees to allocate funds to charities and nonprofits that do not "knowingly employ" people found on federal and international antiterrorism watch lists. Fellow leadership did not approve of this partnership and were forced to withdraw from the program, a move that cost the organization roughly $500,000.

On June 26, 2011, Romero was charged with a DWI after being seen "careening into oncoming traffic" by police. His arrest was not included in any weekly press releases of DWI charges that week and was not made public until it was published in the New York Post on August 10, nearly two months later. Police claim to have inadvertently omitted Romero's arrest, however, critics suggested that the omission was no accident.

Works authored by Romero 
 In Defense of Our America: The Fight for Civil Liberties in the Age of Terror. William Morrow, 2007. .

Recognition
In 2005, he was named one of Time magazine's 25 Most Influential Hispanics.

In 2009, he received the Golden Plate Award of the American Academy of Achievement presented by Awards Council member Archbishop Desmond Tutu at an awards ceremony at St. George’s Cathedral in Cape Town, South Africa.

In 2011, Romero received the "Maggie" Award, highest honor of the Planned Parenthood Federation, in tribute to their founder, Margaret Sanger.

He was featured in the HBO documentary The Latino List.

Romero is the recipient of the 2020 Woodrow Wilson Award from Princeton University.

References

External links
 ACLU Biography
 PBS Biography
 Time – Anthony Romero
 
 Hispanic Magazine – Driven By Liberties
 ACLU v. ACLU – The Nation, February 5, 2007

1965 births
American Civil Liberties Union people
American civil rights activists
American lawyers
American people of Puerto Rican descent
American political writers
American male non-fiction writers
American LGBT rights activists
American LGBT writers
LGBT people from New York (state)
Living people
People from the Bronx
Princeton School of Public and International Affairs alumni
Stanford Law School alumni
Activists from New York (state)
Recipients of the Four Freedoms Award
LGBT Hispanic and Latino American people